Mullett Creek is a rural locality in the Bundaberg Region, Queensland, Australia. In the  Mullett Creek had a population of 84 people.

History 
Mullet Creek was formerly part of the locality of Littabella. It was named and bounded on 18 March 2005.

Mullett Creek Provisional School opened circa August 1910 as a half-time school with Baffle Creek Provisional School (meaning they shared a single teacher between the two schoos). Baffle Creek School closed in 1915, after which Mullett Creek Provisional school remained a half-time school with Arthur's Creek Provisional School. In 1916 it became a full-time school (no longer sharing its teacher). On 17 January 1920 it became Mullett Creek State School. It closed circa 1963. The school name sometimes appears as "Mullet" (one "t").

In the  Mullett Creek had a population of 84 people.

References 

Bundaberg Region
Coastline of Queensland
Localities in Queensland